The 2003 Swindon Borough Council election took place on 1 May 2003 to elect members of Swindon Unitary Council in Wiltshire, England. One third of the council was up for election and the council stayed under no overall control.

After the election, the composition of the council was
Conservative 29
Labour 22
Liberal Democrat 8

Voting trial
Swindon was one of 3 councils which trialed voting by television in 2003 for the first time anywhere in the world. Voters in Swindon also had 8 electronic information kiosks in the town centre where they could vote, telephone and internet voting. These trials, which were open for voting in the week before the election, followed a trial of electronic voting in the 2002 election which saw turnout increase by 3.5%.

Overall turnout in the election was 29.82%, lower than in 2002. However the number of electronic votes increased by 75% from 2002 to 11,055, including 349 cast by television.

Election result

Ward results

References

2003 English local elections
2003
2000s in Wiltshire